Ang Ating Musika was a concert residency by Filipina singer Regine Velasquez at the Aliw Theater in Pasay. The residency began on November 9 and concluded on November 24, 2007, after completing six shows. The set list featured all OPM numbers that were curated from the catalogue of Filipino composers and songwriters. These included material from George Canseco, Ryan Cayabyab, Rey Valera, and Basil Valdez, among others. The show was produced by Aria Productions, with GMA Network as its broadcast partner. Velasquez served as the stage director, while Raul Mitra was chosen as the music director. Martin Nievera, Jona Viray, Aicelle Santos, Maricris Garcia, and Kyla performed as guests. Reviews for the shows were generally positive, receiving praise for the theme and Velasquez's live performance.

Background and development
Regine Velasquez's early-career music was rooted in OPM, which were dominated by "kundiman" ballads and bubblegum pop love songs. A musical style that was particularly apparent during the late 1980s when she released her self-titled debut album. In an article published by the Philippine Daily Inquirer promoting her reality show Celebrity Duets: Philippine Edition on October 14, 2007, Velasquez revealed that she would headline a concert the following month at the Aliw Theater in Pasay titled Ang Ating Musika. The show's name and concept was crafted from Velasquez's desire to perform OPM material, which she described as a "tribute to the country's best songwriters and composers". The set list featured songs selected by Velasquez and her team from the catalogue of notable Filipino musicians, including Freddie Aguilar, George Canseco, Ryan Cayabyab, Louie Ocampo, Vehnee Saturno, Rey Valera, Basil Valdez, Yoyoy Villame.

The show was produced by Aria Productions, in partnership with GMA Network. Velasquez served as the stage director, while Raul Mitra was chosen as the music director. Martin Nievera, Jona Viray, Aicelle Santos, Maricris Garcia, and Kyla were selected as guest acts. Velasquez described the song selection process as a daunting task, saying, "I don't want to miss out on any song or songwriter that's why I thought of doing two concerts-in-one." During planning and rehearsals, the production team initially came up with eighty song titles, which was eventually reduced. "Narrowing it down to only 19 proved difficult, if not impossible", she said. At Velasquez's request, several living composers and songwriters were invited to attend the concerts. Ang Ating Musika was aired as a television special on December 2, 2007, on GMA.

Synopsis and reception

The stage design looked like a tropical garden adorned with grass and trees. It resembled a scaled-down version of the Philippine landmark Luneta Park. The concert opened with an overture rendition of the theme from Hajji Alejandro's 2009 album Hajji At Iba Pang Tunog Pinoy. The performance began with Velasquez, wearing a white gown, making her way to the stage as she is carried by a motorized tricycle to perform "Kay Ganda Ng Ating Musika" accompanied by background dancers wearing traditional Filipino costumes. She then gets off of the vehicle and transitioned to "Hibang sa Awit" and "Limang Dipang Tao". The singer continued into a slower number, a Rey Valera-composed track "Sinasamba Kita", before she was joined by Jona Viray, Aicelle Santos, Maricris Garcia, and April de los Santos to perform a medley of OPM songs she recorded.

The second act saw Velasquez changing outfits into a red mermaid gown, and beginning a performance with Kyla of the soundtrack themes from its eponymous films, including "Saan Darating ang Umaga", "Gaano Kadalas ang Minsan", "Paano Ba Ang Mangarap", and "Kastilyong Buhangin". She then followed this with a sultry rendition of Yoyoy Villame's novelty hit "Butchikik". Velasquez continued with a medley of songs from singer-songwriter Odette Quesada. The third act began with Martin Nievera who joined the show to premiere him and Velasquez's duet "Kailangan Mo, Kailangan Ko". She then performed a medley of Ryan Cayabyab compositions while sitting by the stairs in the middle of the stage, and goes straight into another medley that paid tribute to George Canseco. Ang Ating Musika closed with an encore performance of Florante's "Handog" and Celeste Legaspi's "Minsan Ang Minahal Ay AKo".

Jo-An Maglipon of the Philippine Entertainment Portal praised the show's production value, mostly due to the well-crafted repertoire. She noted that Velasquez gave an emotional performance that resonated with her audience. Maglipon conlcuded, "Regine's endeavor to revive Original Pilipino Music is very much appreciated and should be applauded as a noble effort to rekindle interest in our rich musical heritage. Boy Abunda from The Philippine Star agreed with Maglipon in terms of the concert's variety and selection of OPM numbers, and considered Velasquez's collaboration with her guest performers a show highlight.

Set list
The set list given below was performed on November 24, 2007. The list evolved over the course of the concert residency, and sometimes included other numbers.
 "Kay Ganda ng Ating Musika" / "Hibang sa Awit" / "Limang Dipang Tao"
 "Sinasamba Kita"
 "Sana Maulit Muli" / "Dadalhin" / "Ikaw."
 "Saan Darating ang Umaga" / "Gaano Kadalas ang Minsan" / "Paano Ba Ang Mangarap" / "Tubig at Langis" / "Kastilyong Buhangin"
 "Butchikik"
 "Till I Met You" / "A Friend of Mine" / "Don't Know What to Say (Don't Know What to Do)" / "Special Memory"
 "Kailangan Mo, Kailangan Ko"
 "Sometime, Somewhere" / "How Can I?" / "Now That You're Gone"
 "Hanggang Sa Dulo Nang Walang Hanggan" / "Kung Ako'y Iiwan Mo" / "Ngayon At Kailanman"
 Encore 
 "Handog" / "Minsan Ang Minahal Ay AKo"

Shows

Personnel
Credits and personnel are adapted from the television special Ang Ating Musika.

Show

 Wilma V. Galvanteexecutive in charge of production
 Regine Velasquezshow direction, staging
 Raul Mitramusical director
 Louie Ignaciotelevision director
 Perry Lansiganassistant television director
 Juel Balbonexecutive producer
 Cacai Velasquez-Mitraexecutive producer, stage design
 Hazel Abonitaproduction manager
 Darling de Jesussupervising producer
 Epoy Isonerastage manager
 Paulo Paulinolighting director
 Jun Bon Rusticosound engineer
 Maro Garciaassociate producer
 Cez Urrutiaassociate producer
 Diane Rogueproduction associates
 Decca Pinedaproduction associates
 Pepsi Herreracostume design
 Edwin Tancostume design
 Cary Santiagocostume design

Band

 Cesar Aguasguitars
 Meong Pacanaguitars
 Sonny Matiaskeyboards
 Bond Samsonkeyboards
 Tek Faustinodrums
 Niño Regaladopercussion
 Romeo Palanapercussion
 Rudy Lolanopercussion
 Babsie Molinabackground vocalist
 Sylvia Macaraegbackground vocalist
 Rene Martinezbackground vocalist

Notes

See also
 List of Regine Velasquez live performances

References

External links
 Tours of Regine Velasquez at Live Nation

Regine Velasquez concert tours
2007 concert residencies